WR 148 is a spectroscopic binary in the constellation Cygnus.  The primary star is a Wolf–Rayet star and one of the most luminous stars known.  The secondary has been suspected of being a stellar-mass black hole but may be a class O main sequence star.

WR 148 shows a classic WN8h spectrum, but with the addition of weak central absorption on some of the emission lines. NIII and NIV emission lines are stronger than NV, and HeI lines are stronger than HeII, The Balmer series hydrogen lines and some other lines have P Cygni profiles.

WR 148 is erratically variable on timescales ranging from seconds to years, but it shows consistent brightness and radial velocity variations with a period of 4.32 days. There is little doubt that it is a binary system, due to the regular variations and the presence of hard x-ray radiation from colliding winds, but the secondary is not clearly detectable in the spectrum.  One proposal for a companion that would match the faint absorption features would be a B3 subgiant, but that is not compatible with the orbit.  An early calculated orbit based on faint absorption features gave a relatively large mass ratio which imply either a very high companion mass, meaning a black hole, or an unreasonably low primary mass for a luminous WR star.  Another analysis of the spectrum finds absorption features consistent with an O5 star, similar masses for the two components, and only a small orbital inclination.

Because of its erratic changes in apparent magnitude at so many frequencies WR 148 is classified in the General Catalogue of Variable Stars as a unique type of variable, not a member of any of the defined classes. The shape of the light curve is unusual and has been modelled as being produced by an extended secondary object which may be an ionised cavity in the dense wind of the primary star, produced as the secondary orbits at a distance comparable to the radius of the primary star.

WR 148 is found unusually far from the galactic plane for a Wolf–Rayet star, at 500–800 pc. Young massive stars such as WN8h WR stars are members of the thin disc population, on average only 60 pc from the galactic plane. It is suggested that WR 148 is a runaway from a supernova explosion.

References

Cygnus (constellation)
Wolf–Rayet stars
Durchmusterung objects
197406
Cygni, V1687
102088
Stellar black holes
O-type main-sequence stars
Spectroscopic binaries